The 1973 Australia rugby union tour of Europe was a series of nine matches played by the Australia national rugby union team (the Wallabies) in England and Wales in October and November 1973. The Wallabies won only of three of their matches, lost five and drew the other one; they lost both of their international matches, against Wales and England. The final match with Italy, is not considered as a capped Test match by Australian Rugby Union

Matches 
Scores and results list Australia's points tally first.

Touring party
 Manager: John Freedman
 Assistant manager: Bob Templeton
 Captain: Peter Sullivan

Backs

Dave Burnet
Rex l'Estrange
Russell Fairfax
Rod Hauser
John Hipwell
Arthur McGill
Laurie Monaghan
Geoff Richardson
Owen Stephens
Jeff McLean
Peter Rowles
Geoff Shaw

Forwards

Bruce Battishall
Chris Carberry
Dick Cocks
Garrick Fay
Mick Freney
Ron Graham
Stuart Gregory
Jake Howard
Stuart Macdougall
Ken McCurrach
Tony Shaw
Reg Smith
Peter Sullivan

References

Notes 

1973 rugby union tours
1973
1973
1973
1973
1973–74 in English rugby union
1973–74 in Welsh rugby union
1973–74 in European rugby union